Hubbard Paul Law (January 27, 1921 — March 29, 1995) was an American football guard who played six seasons with the Pittsburgh Steelers of the National Football League. He played college football at Sam Houston State University for the Sam Houston State Bearkats football team.

References

1921 births
1995 deaths
Players of American football from Houston
American football guards
Pittsburgh Steelers players
Sam Houston Bearkats football players